Fair Oaks is an unincorporated community and census-designated place in Douglas County, in the U.S. state of Oregon. It lies at the south end of Driver Valley and along Calapooya Creek, between Sutherlin and Nonpareil by road and upstream from Oakland along the creek. As of the 2010 census, it had a population of 278.

Fair Oaks was named for the oak trees in its vicinity. It had its own post office from 1878 through 1882, and thereafter Fair Oaks mail went via the post office at Oakland.

Demographics

References

Unincorporated communities in Douglas County, Oregon
Census-designated places in Oregon
Census-designated places in Douglas County, Oregon
Unincorporated communities in Oregon